Daniels Pass (elevation ) is a high mountain pass in Wasatch County, Utah traversed by U.S. Route 40. It is the summit of Daniels Canyon on the road between Heber and Strawberry Reservoir. The pass is located within the Uinta National Forest and just inside the Uintah and Ouray Indian Reservation.

References

Mountain passes of Utah
Landforms of Wasatch County, Utah
U.S. Route 40